Megisba is a genus of butterflies in the family Lycaenidae.

Species
Megisba strongyle (Felder, 1860) - Australasian realm
Megisba malaya (Horsfield, [1828]) - Indomalayan realm

External links
"Megisba Moore, [1881]" at Markku Savela's Lepidoptera and Some Other Life Forms

Polyommatini
Lycaenidae genera